The 2017 Copa Libertadores final stages were played from 4 July to 29 November 2017. A total of 16 teams competed in the final stages to decide the champions of the 2017 Copa Libertadores.

Qualified teams
The winners and runners-up of each of the eight groups in the group stage advanced to the round of 16.

Seeding

Starting from the round of 16, the teams were seeded according to their results in the group stage, with the group winners (Pot 1 in round of 16 draw) seeded 1–8, and the group runners-up (Pot 2 in round of 16 draw) seeded 9–16.

Format

Starting from the round of 16, the teams played a single-elimination tournament with the following rules:
Each tie was played on a home-and-away two-legged basis, with the higher-seeded team hosting the second leg (Regulations Article 3.10).
In the round of 16, quarterfinals, and semifinals, if tied on aggregate, the away goals rule would be used. If still tied, extra time would not be played, and the penalty shoot-out would be used to determine the winner (Regulations Article 5.2).
In the finals, if tied on aggregate, the away goals rule would not be used, and 30 minutes of extra time would be played. If still tied after extra time, the penalty shoot-out would be used to determine the winner (Regulations Article 5.3).

There were two format changes from the previous season:
While the seeding was still used to decide the order of legs, it was no longer used to decide the bracket, which was decided by the round of 16 draw.
If there were two semifinalists from the same association, the bracket was no longer adjusted and remained as it was.

Draw

The draw for the round of 16 was held on 14 June 2017, 20:00 PYT (UTC−4), at the CONMEBOL Convention Center in Luque, Paraguay. For the round of 16, the 16 teams were drawn into eight ties (A–H) between a group winner (Pot 1) and a group runner-up (Pot 2), with the group winners hosting the second leg. Teams from the same association or the same group could be drawn into the same tie.

Bracket
The bracket starting from the round of 16 was determined as follows:

The bracket was decided based on the round of 16 draw, which was held on 14 June 2017.

Round of 16
The first legs were played on 4–6 July, and the second legs were played on 8–10 August 2017.

|}

Match A

River Plate won 3–1 on aggregate and advanced to the quarterfinals (Match S1).

Match B

Santos won 4–2 on aggregate and advanced to the quarterfinals (Match S2).

Match C

Botafogo won 3–0 on aggregate and advanced to the quarterfinals (Match S3).

Match D

Tied 1–1 on aggregate, San Lorenzo won on penalties and advanced to the quarterfinals (Match S4).

Match E

Lanús won 2–1 on aggregate and advanced to the quarterfinals (Match S4).

Match F

Grêmio won 3–1 on aggregate and advanced to the quarterfinals (Match S3).

Match G

Tied 1–1 on aggregate, Barcelona won on penalties and advanced to the quarterfinals (Match S2).

Match H

Jorge Wilstermann won 1–0 on aggregate and advanced to the quarterfinals (Match S1).

Quarterfinals
The first legs were played on 13–14 September, and the second legs were played on 20–21 September 2017.

|}

Match S1

River Plate won 8–3 on aggregate and advanced to the semifinals (Match F1).

Match S2

Barcelona won 2–1 on aggregate and advanced to the semifinals (Match F2).

Match S3

Grêmio won 1–0 on aggregate and advanced to the semifinals (Match F2).

Match S4

Tied 2–2 on aggregate, Lanús won on penalties and advanced to the semifinals (Match F1).

Semifinals
The first legs were played on 24–25 October, and the second legs were played on 31 October and 1 November 2017.

|}

Match F1

Lanús won 4–3 on aggregate and advanced to the finals.

Match F2

Grêmio won 3–1 on aggregate and advanced to the finals.

Finals

In the finals, if tied on aggregate, the away goals rule would not be used, and 30 minutes of extra time would be played. If still tied after extra time, the penalty shoot-out would be used to determine the winner (Regulations Article 5.3).

The first leg was played on 22 November, and the second leg was played on 29 November 2017.

Grêmio won 3–1 on aggregate.

References

External links
 
CONMEBOL Libertadores Bridgestone 2017, CONMEBOL.com 

3
July 2017 sports events in South America
August 2017 sports events in South America
September 2017 sports events in South America
October 2017 sports events in South America
November 2017 sports events in South America